Duane Calvin Acker (born March 13, 1931) is an American academic. He served as the president of Kansas State University from 1975 to 1986. Acker attended Iowa State University and Oklahoma State University and holds B.S., M.S., and Ph.D. degrees in animal husbandry. He has taught at Iowa State University, Kansas State University, South Dakota State University, and the University of Nebraska. He also served as administrator of the International Cooperation and Development and Foreign Agricultural Service from 1990 to 1993, and as assistant secretary of USDA for Science and Education.

References

1931 births
Living people
Kansas State University faculty
Presidents of Kansas State University
Iowa State University alumni
Oklahoma State University alumni